The 2002–03 season was Deportivo de La Coruña's 32nd season in La Liga, the top division of Spanish football. They also competed in the Copa del Rey, the UEFA Champions League and the Supercopa de España.

Season summary

The 2002–03 season, Javier Irureta's fifth in charge, started in style for Deportivo. As defending Copa del Rey champions, they qualified for the 2002 Supercopa de España, where they faced Valencia. Three first half goals from Juan Carlos Valerón, Víctor Sánchez and Noureddine Naybet gave them a big advantage after the first leg at Estadio Riazor, and a further goal from Víctor at Mestalla Stadium ensured a 4–0 aggregate victory. Depor therefore claimed the Supercopa trophy for the second time in three seasons.

In La Liga, they just failed to match their top two finishes of the past three years, ending up 3rd, although they still qualified for the 2003–04 UEFA Champions League. In the 2002–03 edition of that tournament, they made it through a tough first round group in which they faced Bayern Munich, Lens and Milan. Their progress was assured after an excellent 2–1 win against the Italians at San Siro on the final matchday. Another tough draw awaited in the second group stage, where they faced Basel, Juventus and Manchester United. Despite finishing level on points with the Swiss and Italian sides, they were eliminated bottom of the group on goal difference, failing to match their quarter-final exploits of the previous two seasons.

In the Copa del Rey, too, they just fell short of their previous high standards. The defending champions were eliminated at the semi-final stage by eventual winners Mallorca. It was a great season for striker Roy Makaay, whose 29 league goals won him both the Pichichi Trophy and the European Golden Shoe.

Players

Squad

Left club during season

Squad stats 
Last updated on 2 April 2021.

|-
|colspan="14"|Players who have left the club after the start of the season:

|}

Competitions

La Liga

League table

Matches

Copa del Rey

UEFA Champions League

First group stage

Second group stage

Supercopa de España

References

Deportivo de La Coruna
Deportivo de La Coruña seasons